The first stamps that Canada Post released to commemorate an Olympic event were in commemoration of the 1976 Summer Olympics. This event was held in Montreal. The issue date of these patriotic memorabilia is dated September 20, 1973 and the issue price was 8 cents. It is noteworthy that the issue date coincides with the opening day of the British North America Philatelic Society meeting in Calgary. This is significant because both the design and purpose of this stamp is geared towards the interests of philatelists and all Canadian citizens alike.

Furthermore, this was one of the first released collections but not the last to commemorate the Montreal Olympics. The custom design boasts five interlacing rings, topped with a crown. It also features a symbolic "m". The foundation's underlying, consequential reaction was to provoke the pervading universal brotherhood Olympic spirit. While the "m" signified the three tiered winners'. The podium is symbolic of the glory the winner shall extrude, the chivalrous spirit of a well, earned and contested victory.

In another interpretation, at the center of the logo there is a discernible visual of the Olympic stadium's track. This is where the spectator and team players are united. Unified not only in game spirit but in a frontline visual spectatorship.

1976 Montreal Olympics

1973

1974

Semi-Postals

1975

Water Sports Series

Sculptures

1976

Team Sports and Gymnastics

Arts & Culture Programme

Olympic Sites

Ceremonies

1976 Summer Paralympics 
The 1976 Olympiad for the Physically Disabled, lasting from August 3 to 11, marks the twenty-fifth renewal of the International Stoke Mandeville Games, which take place annually in England except for every fourth year, when they move to the nation staging the Summer Olympics.

The site of the competitions will be Centennial Park, a  facility in the Borough of Etobicoke, a part of Metropolitan Toronto. The park contains a stadium, two Olympic standard pools, a gymnasium, a double rink arena, and even a ski hill which will serve as a backdrop for archery, one of the first sports ever introduced to the disabled. The Olympiad will feature, among other events, swimming, track and field, shooting, weightlifting, snooker and table tennis.

This commemorative features a mixed-media painting by Tom Bjarnason, an internationally-known Toronto illustrator. He has chosen to portray an archer as the embodiment of skill, strength and confidence, on a background of fresh, spring green, signifying growth and hope.

1976 Winter Olympics
The 1976 Winter Olympic Games were held in Innsbruck from 4 February to 15 February. The capital of the Austrian province of Tyrol, also hosted the 1964 Winter Olympics. Rolf Harder, the designer of the Innsbruck Winter Games stamp, studied both Fine Arts and Graphic Arts at the Academy in Hamburg, and worked professionally in that city before coming to Canada in 1955. He has created a graphic design using the official Innsbruck Olympic Symbol combined with a stylized snow crystal. The blue-grey background represents a cold winter sky and serves to dramatize the five bright colours of the Olympic rings.

1980 Winter Olympics
The stamp for the 1980 Winter Olympic Games at Lake Placid, N. Y., was designed by Clermont Malenfant of Design G, Montreal. Using an action shot of a skier, by photographer Dinh Ngoc Mô, the design emphasizes the strenuous physical activity of Olympic winter sports.  Canada. Post Office Department. [Postage Stamp Press Release], 1980.

1988 Calgary Olympics
Designer Pierre-Yves Pelletier of Montreal uses a stylized, diagonal-screen interpretation of sports photographs as seen on previous stamps issued for the Calgary Olympic Winter Games.
 Anyone with information on the First Issue is welcome to contribute.

1986, First Issue

1986, Second Issue
The second issue of Calgary Winter Olympic stamps features two of the Olympic sports: hockey, one of Canada's favourite sport, and the biathlon, which is steadily growing in popularity.

1987, Third Issue
The third issue of Calgary Olympic Winter Games stamps features bobsleigh and speedskating.

1987, Fourth Issue
The fourth issue of Calgary Olympic Winter Games stamps features cross-country skiing and ski jumping.

1988, Final Set
The final set of Calgary Olympic Winter Games stamps appears on the eve of the Games themselves. The stamps feature alpine skiing, figure skating, luge and curling.
These stamps, and the entire 11-stamp set dedicated to the 1988 Olympic Winter Games in Calgary, were designed by Pierre-Yves Pelletier of Montreal.
The images featured were created using a unique diagonal half-tone dot screen on photographs of athletes in action. The screen was specially designed by Mr. Pelletier for the stamp series.

1992 Winter Olympics
Canada Post Corporation will honour the XVI Olympic Winter Games, being held this year in France, with a commemorative stamp booklet of five se-tenant stamp designs. The stamps are being issued on February 7, 1992 - a day before the Games officially open in Albertville. Five separate sports have been chosen to represent Canada's participation in these Olympic Winter Games. Among the most popular and spectacular, these include alpine skiing, figure skating, ski jumping, hockey and bobsledding.

1992 Summer Olympics
Many of the world's top athletes, including Canada's best, will be competing in Barcelona, Spain from July 25 to August 9 at the 1992 Olympic Summer Games. One of 12 top corporate sponsors, Canada Post Corporation is issuing a booklet of 10 stamps on June 15, commemorating the Canadian athlete's participation. The five stamp designs depict track and field, gymnastics, swimming, diving and cycling.

1996 Summer Olympics, Sporting Heroes Series
To mark the centenary of the Olympic Games, and to honour the contribution made by our athletes over a hundred years, Canada Post Corporation is pleased to unveil a new series of five domestic rate stamps featuring Canadian gold medalists.

The new Sporting Heroes series was designed by Mark Koudis of Atlanta Art and Design Inc. of Toronto. His first work for Canada Post, the series features evocative sepia toned photographs of these five prominent medalists with the athlete's name, the event and year of victory prominent in the design. The five rings of the Olympics are faintly visible in the centre of each stamp.

2002 Winter Olympics
To celebrate the spirit of the 2002 Winter Games taking place February 8–24, 2002 in Salt Lake City, Canada Post will issue four stamps featuring some of the most exciting events of the games.  Produced by Bhandari and Plater Inc. of Toronto, the stamp designs reflect the speed, agility and grace of winter sports - as well as the cool crisp colours of their surroundings and the team uniforms.

2004 Summer Olympics
In 2004, the Summer Games of the XXVIII Olympiad will be held in Athens, Greece, home of the first Olympiad revival of the modern games held in 1896, as well as the original ancient games, which are believed to have begun in the year 776 B.C.
The 16-stamp pane se-tenant domestic (49¢) issue features both a tribute to women's soccer and, with the marathon, a creative invocation of the games' history.
The stamps were designed by veteran stamp designer Pierre-Yves Pelletier, who has designed more than 100 stamps for Canada Post.
The second stamp pays homage to the marathon and the history of the games. The marathon was first introduced in the Modern Olympic Games of 1896 in Athens, and was originally a 40-kilometre race from Marathon, northeast of Athens, to the Olympic Stadium.

2006 Winter Olympics
The spirit of the Winter Olympics is captured in these two stamps, the result of a collaborative conceptual effort by Susan Mavor and Scot Geib of Metaform Communication Design, a design studio based in Vancouver, British Columbia.

2008 Summer Olympics
Designed by q30design inc. from Toronto, the stamp features an abstract image of an athlete with hands overhead carrying a flag. The colours of red, white and gold figure prominently on a clean white background.

2010 Vancouver Olympics

Olympic Mascot Stamps

2010 Winter Paralympics

Paralympic Mascot Stamps

References

 

Canada at the Olympics
Olympic culture
1976 Summer Olympics
1976 Summer Paralympics
1988 Winter Olympics
2010 Winter Olympics
2010 Winter Paralympics
Postage stamps of Canada
Sport on stamps